Qing Chang Ru Zhan Chang (aka The Battle of Love) is a 1957 Hong Kong comedic film directed by Feng Yueh from a script by Eileen Chang. The film was a favorite with critics at the time of its release.

Cast 

 Dai Lin
 Yu Chin
 Yuen Chor

References 

Hong Kong comedy films

1957 films